Phelles was a King of Tyre and the last of four brothers who held the kingship. The only information available about Phelles comes from Josephus’s citation of the Phoenician author Menander of Ephesus, in Against Apion i.18. Here it is said that Phelles slew his brother Aserymus (Astarymus) and then “took the kingdom, and reigned but eight months, though he lived fifty years: he was slain by Ithobalus (Ithobaal I), the priest of Astarte.” He and the three preceding kings were brothers, sons of the nurse of Abdastartus, according to Menander.

The dates given here are according to the work of F. M. Cross and other scholars who take 825 BC as the date of Dido’s flight from her brother Pygmalion, after which she founded the city of Carthage in 814 BC. See the chronological justification for these dates in the Pygmalion of Tyre article.

See also
List of Kings of Tyre
Pygmalion of Tyre

References

Kings of Tyre
9th-century BC rulers
929 BC births
870s BC deaths
9th-century BC Phoenician people